

"Thai Prophecy Verse", also the "Long Song Prophecy for Ayutthaya" is a poem forecasting the future of Thailand. It was composed in a similar vein to  Maha Supina Jataka, which features the reply of Buddha to King Pasenadi of Kosala about the King's sixteen-fold dream.

The poem was first published in the book  edited by Phraya Boranratchathanin (Phon Tejagupta), Governor General of Ayutthaya Monthon and Vice President of the Royal Institute of Thailand at that time. The book was posthumously presented to Rama VI in 1926.

These stanzas exemplify the apocalyptic nature of the poem, and closely reflect the klon verseform of the original:

There are various hypotheses about the poem's origin; it is usually assumed to have been composed during the Ayutthaya Period. However, many academics remain unsure of the author, even though the poem ends with the statement that "The prediction about the Kingdom by Somdet Phra Narai, King of Nopburi, ends here."

Prince Damrong Rachanuphap, father of the Thai history, explained in "Athibai phaen thi phra nakhon si autthaya" that:

It is asserted in "Kham hai kan chao krung kao" (Testimony by the People from the Old Kingdom) that the poem was composed by Somdet Phra Sanphet Thi Paet (King Sanphet VIII; reigned 1703—1708). Academics often supported this, and suspected that the poem was composed with the royal purpose to use as political psychology. King Sanphet the Eighth might have used the poem to erode public faith and trust that the government could maintain the national security. In present periods, Thai rulers also use this poetic work for political purposes.

Furthermore, it could be surmised that the composer of the poem was a person highly educated in astrology, poetry and psychology, as well as of high rank (including, even, kingship), since producing an unfavorable work like this could be dangerous for a commoner.

Notes

References

Thai
 หนังสือ  อธิบายแผนที่พระนครศรีอยุธยากับคำวินิจฉัยของพระยาโบราณราชธานินทร์  ฉบับชำระครั้งที่ 2 ฉบับโรงพิมพ์คุรุสภา พ.ศ. 2509
 เรื่องศิลปและภูมิสถานอยุธยา ของกรมศิลปากร ฉบับโรงพิมพ์คุรุสภา พ.ศ. 2509
 หนังสือ คำให้การชาวกรุงเก่า  โดย อนันต์ อมรรตัย สำนักพิมพ์จดหมายเหตุ 2544
 บทความ เพลงยาวพยากรณ์กรุงศรีอยุธยาโดย  จุลลดา ภักดีภูมินทร์
 นิตยสารสกุลไทย ฉบับที่ 2700 ปีที่  52 ประจำวันอังคารที่  18 กรกฎาคม 2549

English
 

Ayutthaya Kingdom
Poetry collections
Thai poems